Myussera (Miusera; , Mysra; , Myussera) also spelled as Miuseri is an urban settlement located in the Gudauta District of Abkhazia, a disputed region on the Black Sea coast.

See also 
 Ambara church
 Bichvinta-Miuseri Strict Nature Reserve

References 

Populated places in Gudauta District